Foxy is an animated cartoon character featured in the first three animated shorts in the Merrie Melodies series, all distributed by Warner Bros. in 1931. He was the creation of animator Rudolf Ising, who had worked for Walt Disney in the 1920s.

Concept and creation
In 1925, Hugh Harman drew images of mice on a portrait of Walt Disney, a reminder of Disney's fondness for the rodents living at the Laugh-O-Gram Studio in Kansas City, Missouri. Disney and Ub Iwerks would then use it as inspiration for their creating Mickey Mouse, the character who eventually established Disney as a major figure in Hollywood, also sparking a wave of "clones" at competing studios. Comics historian Don Markstein, calling Warner Bros. animator Rudolf Ising's subsequent Foxy "perhaps the leading Mickey Mouse imitator", observed that,

Screen history

Merrie Melodies

Foxy was the star of the first Merrie Melodies cartoons Ising directed for producer Leon Schlesinger (Ising had already helped his partner Hugh Harman create another series, titled Looney Tunes, with the character Bosko). Foxy's first appearance on screen was in August 1931 in Lady, Play Your Mandolin! This short set in the Old West features Foxy developing affection for the tavern singer who would become his girlfriend.

Foxy and his then-nameless girlfriend would appear in another cartoon that same year: Smile, Darn Ya, Smile! (September 5, 1931), a musical set on a trolley. The plot bears some similarities to Trolley Troubles, a 1927 Oswald the Lucky Rabbit cartoon to which Harman and Ising contributed. This also marks the first time Foxy's name was mentioned.

On October 3, 1931, a third short, One More Time, was released. This musical cops-'n'-robbers cartoon would become Foxy's final appearance in the Merrie Melodies series and the character was believed by many to be killed off in the final scene, as a crow shoots Foxy in the back after he successfully captures a street gang.

Foxy's film career ended abruptly with a phone call by Walt Disney, who asked Ising not to use a character so visually similar to Mickey Mouse. He was then replaced by Piggy, who appeared on the following two Merrie Melodies cartoons.

At the end of each short, Foxy comes out from behind a bass drum and says to the viewers, "So long, folks!", which would become the sign-off for Merrie Melodies cartoons until the end of 1934.

Upon leaving Warner Bros. two years later, Ising took the rights to Foxy and other characters he and/or Harman conceived (including Piggy and Goopy Geer). Though Harman-Ising eventually found another distributor in Metro-Goldwyn-Mayer, none of their WB-era characters besides Bosko appeared in any more theatrical cartoons. All three Foxy shorts eventually went into the public domain.

Later appearances
Foxy appeared along with his girlfriend (here christened "Roxy") and fellow forgotten Warner Bros. progenitor Goopy Geer in "Two-Tone Town", an episode of the animated series Tiny Toon Adventures aired on September 28, 1992. The foxes were voiced by Rob Paulsen and Desirée Goyette respectively and were redesigned for the episode. The three live in a world of black-and-white which is visited by the series' stars, Babs Bunny and Buster Bunny. Buster and Babs, feeling sorry for the old timers left in oblivion, decided to help bring Foxy, Roxy and Goopy alongside Big Bee (based on the bee from You're Too Careless With Your Kisses!) back to the limelight. The efforts of the two rabbits work out but results Buster and Babs being featured in guest appearances while the characters they helped become the new TV sensations. Foxy's appearance in this episode is similar to his theatrical version, except that the tear-drop ears are replaced by pointy ones to make him appear more fox-like and less Mickey-like. Also, his shoes lack spats.

References

External links
 

Anthropomorphic foxes
Looney Tunes characters
Male characters in animation
Film characters introduced in 1931
Foxy (Merrie Melodies) films